Shafaat Jamil, Bir Bikrom (1 March 1940 – 11 August 2012) was a Bangladesh Army colonel. He was the commanding officer of the 3rd East Bengal Regiment of Z Force Brigade in Sector 11 of Bangladesh Forces during the War of Bangladesh Independence in 1971. He was among the first Bengali officers who rebelled against the Pakistani Army in the 1971 Liberation War of Bangladesh and later fought in 11 sector and in Sylhet sector.

Early life
He was born on 1 March 1940 in Kishoreganj District. His father A. H. M. Karimullah was a Judicial Officer of East Pakistan Civil Service. Jamil was educated at Dhaka College, University of Dhaka and Pakistan Military Academy, Kakul. He joined the Pakistan Military Academy in 1962.

In 1964, he was commissioned as a Second Lieutenant in the Pakistani Army's East Bengal Regiment. He was a course mate of General Pervez Musharraf, the former President of Pakistan.

Role in Bangladesh Liberation War
In March 1971 Jamil was promoted to the rank of Major in the Pakistani Army. On 27 March 1971, he mutinied against the Pakistani Army with Bengali officers and soldiers of 4th East Bengal Regiment (nicknamed Baby Tigers) after hearing the news of the genocide carried out by the Pakistani Army in East Pakistan/Bangladesh. As a Bangladesh Force (BDF) officer he fought against the Pakistani Forces in Sector-11 until 10 October, when he was ordered to fight in the Sylhet sector in Bangladesh.

In June 1971 he was appointed Commanding Officer of the 3rd East Bengal Regiment in Sector 11 under Sector Commander Major Ziaur Rahman, later Commander of Z Force Brigade. The 3rd East Bengal Regiment participated in numerous operations of varying scale. Zia also entrusted Jamil the defence of the Teldhala area. Under Zia's directive Major Jamil, assisted by Lieutenant Nurun Nabi and Captain Anwar, set up the first functioning Administrative Area there, which included a police station (The Roumari Police Station), a magistrate court, Customs and Excise hall, a public school, a jail house and a 10-bed hospital. On 27 August he was present with Zia at the opening of the first post office and two sub-post offices in the vicinity. On 11 October 1971 Major Shafaat Jamil's 3rd East Bengal Regiment participated in the battles of Chattak, Sylhet, Bangladesh. Although the Chattak Operation failed, under Jamil's leadership the 3rd East Bengal Regiment killed 364 Pakistani soldiers. Major Shafaat Jamil led his battalion in the Radhanagar Operation and he was injured in this battle. Jamil's battalion captured the Pakistani position where the Indian Army's Gurkha Regiment had previously failed.
Later Jamil received medical treatment for battle injuries at Shilong Military Hospital, Shilong, India.

Bangladesh Army
After the Independence War of Bangladesh, Jamil was promoted to Lt. Col. and was awarded Bir Bikram (the third highest gallantry award of Bangladesh). In 1974 he was promoted to Colonel and appointed Brigade Commander of 46 Infantry Brigade of Bangladesh Army at Dhaka Cantonment. He helped Brigadier Khaled Mosharraf to initiate an armed uprising on 3 November 1975 and proceeded towards Banga Bhaban against the regime of Khondaker Mostaq Ahmad. Change came on 6 November with the exit of Moshtaque from the presidency and his replacement by Justice Abu Sadat Mohammad Sayem. On 7 November, a mutiny incited by Abu Taher resulted in the collapse of the coup; Khaled Mosharraf was assassinated while Colonel Jamil was arrested. He was retired from the Bangladesh Army on 26 March 1980.

Death
Jamil lived a quiet life after his retirement and generally stayed far away from the media. In the early hours of 11 August 2012 he was taken to the Combined Military Hospital, Dhaka after complaining of chest pains, however as his health deteriorated on the way, he was taken to Apollo Hospital Dhaka instead. He was declared dead by doctors at the hospital at 2:10 am.

Shafaat Jamil's namaz-e-janaza (funeral prayer) was held at the Central Mosque of Dhaka Cantonment after Duhr prayers on 11 August. State minister for liberation war affairs ministry Captain Tajul Islam (Retired) and several military officers took part in the final prayer. He was buried at Banani's Army graveyard with traditional military honor and state honor.

Chief of the Army Staff General Iqbal Karim Bhuiyan paid his respects to the deceased at Banani's Military graveyard.

Family
He left behind his wife, three sons and four grandchildren. His two eldest sons live in the US while his youngest son is serving in the Bangladesh Army.

References

Further reading
 "The War of Life: The Life of War" by Col. (Rtd) Engr. S I M Nurunnabi Khan Bir Bikram
 Jamil, Shafaat, " '71 Independence War – Bloody Mid-August and November Conspiracy"

1940 births
Bangladesh Army colonels
2012 deaths
University of Dhaka alumni
Recipients of the Bir Bikrom
Burials at Banani Graveyard
Dhaka College alumni
Mukti Bahini personnel